A variety of social, economical, cultural, ethnic, and linguistic factors contributed to the sparking of unrest in eastern and southern Ukraine in 2014, and the subsequent eruption of the Russo-Ukrainian War, in the aftermath of the early 2014 Revolution of Dignity. Following Ukrainian independence from the Soviet Union in 1991, resurfacing historical and cultural divisions and a weak state structure hampered the development of a unified Ukrainian national identity. 

In eastern and southern Ukraine, Russification and ethnic Russian settlement during centuries of Russian rule caused the Russian language to attain primacy, even amongst ethnic Ukrainians. In Crimea, ethnic Russians have comprised the majority of the population since the deportation of the indigenous Crimean Tatars by Soviet General Secretary Joseph Stalin during the Second World War. This contrasts with western and central Ukraine, which were historically ruled by a variety of powers, such as the Polish–Lithuanian Commonwealth and the Austrian Empire. In these areas, the Ukrainian ethnic, national, and linguistic identity remained intact. After the Orange Revolution in 2004, Russia launched a decade-long effort to restore its political influence in Ukraine, by playing on existing domestic fault lines and undermining the central government.

The tensions between these two competing historical and cultural traditions erupted into political and social conflict during the Euromaidan, which began when then Ukrainian president Viktor Yanukovych refused to sign an association agreement with the European Union in November 2013. Support for closer ties with Europe was strong in western and central Ukraine, whilst many in eastern and southern Ukraine traditionally favoured stronger relations with Russia. President Yanukovych, who drew most of his support from eastern regions, was forced out of office in February 2014. His ouster was followed by protests in eastern and southern Ukraine that placed a strong emphasis on the importance of historical ties to Russia, the Russian language, and antipathy towards the Euromaidan movement.

Crimea

Imperial period 
After the Russo-Turkish War of 1768–1774, the Crimean Khanate, a vassal of the Ottoman Empire, formed in 1441, was made nominally independent by the Treaty of Küçük Kaynarca in 1774. It was annexed by the Russian Empire in 1783 as the "Taurida Governorate". The demographics of Crimea underwent dramatic changes in the centuries following the annexation. Prior to its incorporation into Russia, Crimea had been inhabited primarily by Crimean Tatars, a Turkic people who were predominately Muslim. The peninsula was also populated by Pontic Greeks (Urums), Crimean Goths, and Armenians, who were mostly Christian. In the run up to the annexation and immediately after it, Russia encouraged, and later ordered, the removal of all Christians from Crimea, and resettled them on the northern shore of the Sea of Azov, between Mariupol and Nakhichevan-on-Don. Empress Catherine the Great gave many of the lands she annexed to her advisors and friends. Native inhabitants of these lands were frequently forced out, spawning a large exodus of Tatars to Ottoman-controlled Anatolia. Russian settlers were brought in to colonise the lands once occupied by the fleeing Tatars. By 1903, 39.7% of the population of Crimea, excluding the cities of Sevastopol and Yeni-Kale, were members of the Russian Orthodox religion. 44.6% were Muslim. In the context of this survey, the identifier "Muslim" was synonymous with ethnic Crimean Tatars. Russians constituted the majority of the population in the two excluded and separately-administered cities. During and directly prior to this time, Crimea was considered the "heart of Russian Romanticism". It was popular with Russians on holiday because of its warm climate and seaside. This association continued into the Soviet period.

Soviet period
Crimea had autonomy within the Russian Soviet Federative Socialist Republic (SFSR) as the Crimean Autonomous Soviet Socialist Republic (ASSR) from 1921 until 1944. According to the Soviet Census of 1926, 42.2% of the population of the Crimean ASSR was ethnic Russian, 25% was Crimean Tatar, 10.8% was ethnic Ukrainian, 7% was Jewish, and 15% was from other ethnic groups. Germans invaded the Ukrainian SSR and invaded Crimea itself with the launch of the Crimean Campaign that lasted from October 18th, 1941 to July 4th, 1942. The Soviets took back Crimea in 1944 with their Crimean Offensive. Soviet leader Joseph Stalin deported the entire population of Crimean Tatars from Crimea and abolished Crimean autonomy in 1944. At that time, the Crimean Tatars made up about one-fifth of the population of Crimea, and numbered about 183,155 people. Most were sent to the deserts of Soviet-controlled Central Asia. Around 45% of the deportees died during the deportation process. Crimea was made the "Crimean Oblast" of the Russian SFSR. Following these events, for the first time in history, ethnic Russians comprised the majority of the population of Crimea.

Soviet first secretary Nikita Khrushchev transferred Crimea from the Russian SFSR to the Ukrainian SSR in 1954. This event passed with little fanfare, and was viewed as an insignificant "symbolic gesture", as both republics were part of the Soviet Union and answerable to the government in Moscow. Crimean autonomy was re-established in 1991 after a referendum, just prior to the dissolution of the Soviet Union.

Ukrainian period
Ukrainian independence was confirmed by a referendum held on 1 December 1991. In this referendum, 54% of Crimean voters supported independence from the Soviet Union. This was followed by a 1992 vote by the Crimean parliament to hold a referendum on independence from Ukraine, which spawned a two-year crisis over the status of Crimea. At the same time, the Supreme Soviet of Russia voted to void the cession of Crimea to Ukraine. In June of the same year, the Ukrainian government in Kyiv voted to give Crimea a large amount of autonomy as the Autonomous Republic of Crimea within Ukraine. Despite this, fighting between the Crimean government, Russian government, and Ukrainian government continued. In 1994, Russian nationalist Yuriy Meshkov won the 1994 Crimean presidential election, and implemented the earlier approved referendum on the status of Crimea. 1.3 million people voted in this referendum, 78.4% of whom supported greater autonomy from Ukraine, whilst 82.8% supported allowing dual Russian-Ukrainian citizenship. Later in that same year, the status of Crimea as part of Ukraine was recognised by Russia, which pledged to uphold the territorial integrity of Ukraine in the Budapest Memorandum. This treaty was also signed by the United States, United Kingdom, and France. Ukraine revoked the Constitution of Crimea and abolished the office of President of Crimea in 1995. Crimea was granted a new constitution in 1998, which granted lesser autonomy than the previous one. Crimean officials would later seek to restore the powers of the previous constitution. Throughout the 1990s, many Crimean Tatar deportees and their descendants returned to Crimea.

One of the main tensions in Russia–Ukraine relations in the aftermath of the dissolution of the Soviet Union was the status of the Black Sea Fleet, which was and is based in Sevastopol. Under the 1997 Russo-Ukrainian Partition Treaty, which determined the ownership of military bases and vessels in Crimea, Russia was allowed to have up to 25,000 troops, 24 artillery systems (with a calibre smaller than 100 mm), 132 armoured vehicles, and 22 military aeroplanes in Crimea. This treaty was extended in 2010 by Ukrainian president Viktor Yanukovych. Under this new agreement, Russia was granted rights to garrison the Black Sea Fleet in Crimea until 2042. Residents of the Crimean city of Feodosia protested against the docking of the US Navy ship "Advantage" in June 2006. The protesters carried signs with anti-NATO slogans, and considered the presence of NATO-affiliated troops an "intrusion". Some commentators in Ukraine viewed the protests as being driven by a "Russian hand".

In the 2010 elections to the Crimean parliament, the Party of Regions received the largest share of votes, whilst the second-placed Communist Party of Ukraine received a much smaller share. Both of these political parties would later be targets of the Euromaidan movement. Former president of Crimea Yuriy Olexandrovich Meshkov called for a referendum on restoring the 1992 Constitution of Crimea in July 2011. As a consequence of this, a local court in Crimea deported Meshkov from Ukraine for five years.

Contemporary demographics

According to the Ukrainian Census of 2001, ethnic Russians comprised 58.5% of the population of Crimea. The next two largest ethnic groups were Ukrainians, who comprised 24% of the population, and Crimean Tatars, who comprised 10.2%. Other minority ethnic groups recorded as present in Crimea include Belarusians and Armenians. 77% of the population of Crimea reported their native language as Russian, 11.4% indicated Crimean Tatar, and 10.1% indicated Ukrainian.

Donbas

Imperial period 
Donbas, or the Donets Basin, is a region that is today composed of the Donetsk and Luhansk oblasts of Ukraine. Previously known for being "Wild Fields" (dyke pole), the area that is now called the Donbas was largely under control of the Ukrainian Cossack Hetmanate and the Turkic Crimean Khanate until the mid-late 18th century, when the Russian Empire, led by Empress Catherine II, conquered the Hetmanate and annexed the Khanate. It named the conquered territories "New Russia" (Novorossiya). As the Industrial Revolution took hold across Europe, the vast coal resources of the Donbas began to be exploited in the mid-late 19th century. This led to a population boom in the region, largely driven by Russian settlers. In 1858, the population of the region was 700,767. By 1897, it had reached 1,453,109. According to the Russian Imperial Census of 1897, ethnic Ukrainians comprised 52.4% of the population of region, whilst ethnic Russians comprised 28.7%. Ethnic Greeks, Germans, Jews and Tatars also had a significant presence in the Donbas, particularly in the district of Mariupol, where they comprised 36.7% of the population. Despite this, Russians constituted the majority of the industrial work-force. Ukrainians dominated rural areas, but cities were often inhabited solely by Russians who had come seeking work in the region's heavy industries. Those ethnic Ukrainians who did move to the cities for work were quickly assimilated into the Russian-speaking worker class.

Soviet period 
Ukrainians in the Donbas were greatly affected by the 1932–33 Holodomor famine and the Russification policy of Joseph Stalin. As most ethnic Ukrainians were rural peasant farmers (called "kulaks" by the Soviet regime), they bore the brunt of the famine. According to the Association of Ukrainians in Great Britain, the population of the area that is now Luhansk Oblast declined by 25% as a result of the famine, whereas it declined by 15–20% in the area that is now Donetsk Oblast. According to one estimate, 81.3% of those who died during the famine in the Ukrainian SSR were ethnic Ukrainians, whilst only 4.5% were ethnic Russians. During the reconstruction of the Donbas after the Second World War, many Russian workers arrived to repopulate the region, further altering the population balance. In 1926, 639,000 ethnic Russians resided in the Donbas. By 1959, the ethnic Russian population had more than doubled to 2.55 million. Russification was further advanced by the 1958–59 Soviet educational reforms, which led to the nigh elimination of all Ukrainian language schooling in the Donbas. By the time of the Soviet Census of 1989, 45% of the population of the Donbas reported their ethnicity as Russian.

Ukrainian period
After the dissolution of the Soviet Union in 1991, residents of the Donbas were generally in favour of stronger ties with Russia, in contrast to the rest of Ukraine. A 1993 strike by miners in the region called for a federal Ukraine and economic autonomy for Donbas. This was followed by a 1994 consultative referendum on various constitutional questions in Donetsk and Luhansk oblasts, held concurrently with the first parliamentary elections in independent Ukraine. These questions included whether Russian should be enshrined as an official language of Ukraine, whether Russian should be the language of administration in Donetsk and Luhansk oblasts, whether Ukraine should federalise, and whether Ukraine should have closer ties with the Commonwealth of Independent States. Close to 90% of voters voted in favour of these propositions. None of them were adopted: Ukraine remained a unitary state, Ukrainian was retained as the sole official language, and the Donbas gained no autonomy.

Donbas voters and politicians had wide influence over Ukrainian politics until the 2004 Orange Revolution. Then Prime Minister Viktor Yanukovych, who was the target of that revolution, is from the Donbas, and also found most of his support there. At the revolution's height, pro-Yanukovych regional politicians in the Donbas called for a referendum on the establishment of a "South-East Ukrainian Autonomous Republic", or for secession from Ukraine. This did not happen, and Yanukovych's Party of Regions went on to win the 2006 Ukrainian parliamentary election. He was later elected president in 2010. His government, led by Prime Minister Mykola Azarov, implemented a controversial regional language law in 2012. This law granted a language the status of "regional language" where the percentage of representatives of its ethnic group exceeded 10% of the total population of a defined administrative district. Regional language status allowed use of minority languages in courts, schools and other government institutions in these areas of Ukraine. This meant that the Russian language received recognition in the Donbas for the first time since Ukrainian independence. This law was declared unconstitutional by the Constitutional Court of Ukraine on 28 February 2018 and replaced by a new one in 2019, aimed at strengthening the use of Ukrainian language.

Contemporary demographics
According to the Ukrainian Census of 2001, 57.2% of the population of the Donbas was ethnic Ukrainian, 38.5% was ethnic Russian, and 4.3% belonged to other ethnic groups, mainly Greeks (1.1%) and Belarusians (0.9%). 72.8% of the population reported that their native language was Russian, whilst 26.1% reported that it was Ukrainian. Other languages, spoken mainly by minority ethnic groups, accounted for 1.1% of the population. Amongst these groups, only the Roma were reported as not using Russian in daily life, citing Romani instead.

Kharkiv Oblast

Large numbers of ethnic Ukrainian settlers first came to the land that is now Kharkiv Oblast, previously a sparsely populated region, around the time of the 1648–57 Khmelnytsky uprising. These settlers had fled fighting between Ukrainian Cossacks and the Polish–Lithuanian Commonwealth near the Dnieper River. The area that they settled in was named "Sloboda Ukraine" (Slobidska Ukraina). Over the following centuries, multiple waves of immigration to Sloboda Ukraine brought both ethnic Ukrainians and ethnic Russians. Prior to the 19th century, only small numbers of Russians settled in the area. They tended to live in cities, whilst rural areas were dominated by ethnic Ukrainians. The region had an autonomous Cossack government until it was abolished by Catherine the Great in 1765. By 1832, the urban-rural divide became firmly entrenched: 50% of merchants were ethnic Russians, as were 45% of factory owners. In line with this increasing Russification, the name Sloboda Ukraine was replaced by Kharkov Governorate in 1835. Ethnic Russians in agriculture-dominated Kharkiv were never as numerous as in industrial Donbas, and the region always retained a distinct Ukrainian culture. The Imperial Census of 1897 recorded the native language of 80.6% of the population of Kharkov Governorate as Ukrainian, whereas Russian was recorded as the native language of only 17.7% of the population.

The city of Kharkiv became the capital of the Ukrainian SSR in 1922. During the 1932–33 Holodomor famine, the ethnic Ukrainian-populated countryside of Kharkiv Oblast was devastated. At the same time, the city of Kharkiv became heavily industrialised, and its ethnic Russian population boomed. By the time of the Soviet Census of 1989, 33.2% of the population of Kharkiv Oblast identified as ethnic Russian, and 48.1%  of the population reported that their native language was Russian.

Contemporary demographics
According to the Ukrainian Census of 2001, ethnic Ukrainians comprised 70.7% of the population of Kharkiv Oblast, whilst ethnic Russians comprised 25.6%. Other minority ethnic groups recorded as present in Kharkiv Oblast include Armenians, Jews, and Belarusians. 53.8% of the population reported that their native language was Ukrainian, whilst 44.3% reported that it was Russian.

Odesa Oblast
In 1593, the Ottoman Empire conquered the area that is now Odesa Oblast, and incorporated it as the Özü Eyalet, unofficially known as the Khan Ukraine. In the aftermath of the Russo-Turkish War of 1787–92, Yedisan, roughly corresponding to the modern city of Odesa, was recognised by the Ottoman Empire in the Treaty of Jassy as part of the Russian Empire. According to the first Russian Empire census of the Yedisan region, conducted in 1793 after the expulsion of the Nogai Tatars, forty-nine villages of the sixty-seven between the Dniester River and the Southern Bug River were ethnically Romanian (also called Moldavians). Subsequently, ethnic Russians colonised the area, and established many new cities and ports. In 1819, the city of Odessa became a free port. It was home to a very diverse population, and was frequented by Black Sea traders. In less than a century, the city of Odessa grew from a small fortress to the biggest city in the region of New Russia.

At the time of the Imperial Census of 1897, the population of the approximate area of modern Odessa Oblast was 1,115,949. According to that census, 33.9% of the population was ethnic Ukrainian, 26.7% was ethnic Russian, 16.1% was ethnic Jewish, 9.2% was ethnic Moldavian, 8.6% was ethnic German, 2% was ethnic Polish, and 1.6% was ethnic Bulgarian. These numbers show that there was a high level of ethnic diversity in the region, and that no group had an outright majority.

In the early period of the Ukrainian SSR, Odessa Governorate was formed out of parts of the former Kherson Governorate. This new area formed the basis for modern Odessa Oblast. Throughout the interwar period, Budjak was part of the Kingdom of Romania. The 1932–33 Holodomor famine had a profound demographic effect on the region. Its population declined by 15–20%. About a decade later, the Nazi occupation of Ukraine during the Second World War had a devastating impact on the region's previously large Jewish population. Also during the war, the ethnically-diverse Budjak was annexed to the Ukrainian SSR as Izmail Oblast. It was merged into Odessa Oblast in 1954.

By the time of the Soviet Census of 1989, 27.4% of the population of Odessa Oblast identified themselves as ethnic Russian, whilst 55.2% identified themselves as ethnic Ukrainians. The remainder was made up mostly of Moldavians, Bulgarians and Gagauz.

Contemporary demographics
According to the Ukrainian Census of 2001, ethnic Ukrainians comprised 62.8% of the population of Odesa Oblast, whilst ethnic Russians comprised 20.7%. Significant Bulgarian and Moldavian communities are present, centred on the historical region of Budjak. These comprised 6.1% and 5% of the population of Odessa Oblast respectively. 46.3% of the population reported that their native language was Ukrainian, whilst 41.9% reported that it was Russian. 11.8% specified other languages, mainly Bulgarian and Moldavian.

See also 
 Demographics of Ukraine#Ethnic groups
 Demographics of Crimea

References

2014 pro-Russian unrest in Ukraine
Prelude to the 2022 Russian invasion of Ukraine
History of Ukraine since 1991
Military history of Ukraine
Political history of Ukraine
Russia–Ukraine relations